The Richetli Pass is a high mountain pass in the Glarus Alps in the Swiss canton of Glarus.

The trail forms part of the Alpine Pass Route, a long-distance hiking trail across Switzerland between Sargans and Montreux.

See also
 List of mountain passes in Switzerland

References

External links
Rechetli Pass on Via Alpina web site
Richtlipass on Hikr web site

Mountain passes of the Alps
Mountain passes of the canton of Glarus